Doireann Ní Ghríofa is an Irish poet and essayist who writes in both Irish and English.

Biography
Doireann Ní Ghríofa was born in Galway in 1981, but grew up in County Clare. She now lives in County Cork.

Ní Ghríofa has been published widely in literary magazines in Ireland and abroad, such as Poetry, The Irish Times, Irish Examiner, Prairie Schooner, and The Stinging Fly. In 2012 her poem "Fáinleoga" won the Wigtown Award for poetry written in Scottish Gaelic. Ní Ghríofa was selected for the prestigious Ireland Chair of Poetry Bursary Award 2014–2015.

In 2016 her book Clasp was shortlisted for The Irish Times Poetry Now Award, the national poetry prize of Ireland and was awarded the Michael Hartnett Award. She was also awarded the Rooney Prize for Irish Literature in 2016.

A trilingual collaborative pamphlet written with Choctaw poet LeAnne Howe appeared in 2017.

In 2018, Ní Ghríofa received the Premio Ostana literary award (Italy) 
and was chosen as a Seamus Heaney Centre Fellow  at Queen's University Belfast.

Ní Ghríofa collaborated with the artist Alice Maher on the limited edition book Nine Silences published by Salvage Press in 2018.

She is a recipient of a Lannan Literary Award Fellowship.

In 2019 she was a contributor to A New Divan: A Lyrical Dialogue between East and West (Gingko Library).

In 2020 her book A Ghost in the Throat won Book of the Year at the An Post Irish Book of the Year awards, the Foyles Non-Fiction Book of the Year award and the Hodges Figgis Irish Book of the Year award. It was shortlisted for the 2021 Folio Prize, named as a New York Times Notable Book of the Year and a Publishers Weekly Best Book of 2021. The book was largely written as she sat in her car on the roof of a multi-storey car park in Ballincollig, after dropping her daughter to creche.

In 2021, A Ghost in the Throat won the £10,000 James Tait Black Prize for biography.

Ní Ghríofa's poem "Escape: A Chorus in Capes" from her 2021 collection To Star The Dark was deemed Highly Commended by the Forward Prize For Poetry. The collection also features poems "While Bleeding", "Craquelure" and "Lunulae." To Star the Dark is counted amongst the 'Best Poetry of 2021' by The Irish Times.

Bibliography

Poetry collections
 Résheoid (Coiscéim, 2011)
 Dúlasair (Coiscéim, 2012)
 Dordéan, do Chroí / A Hummingbird, your Heart (Smithereens Press, 2014) 
 Clasp (Dedalus Press, 2015)
 Oighear (Coiscéim, 2017)
  Singing, Still - A Libretto for the 1847 Choctaw Gift to the Irish for Famine Relief  (In collaboration with LeAnn Howe, 2017)
 Lies (Dedalus Press, 2018)
 To Star the Dark (Dedalus Press, 2021; ISBN 9781910251867)

Prose
 A Ghost in the Throat (Tramp Press and Biblioasis, 2020)

Critical response
Of Ní Ghríofa's book Clasp, Maya Catherine Popa in Poetry wrote: 
"The poems excel in their consideration of motherhood, particularly its paradoxical losses and gains, separation and unity… In Ní Ghríofa’s English debut, what seem to be long-considered obsessions are explored with tenderness and unflinching curiosity. The collection’s section titles, “Clasp,” “Cleave,” “Clench,” suggest the muscularity of attachment to the past, place, and the body that drives the poetic impulse."

According to Clíona Ní Riordáin of Southword, "The woman’s body is central to the collection, highlighted, visible, unconquered. Forgotten bones are reclaimed, gendered territory is staked out; it is clear that Ní Ghríofa’s has a voice which will not be silenced… In Clasp Ní Ghríofa has signalled that she is a poetic force to be reckoned with."

Nina McLaughlin of the New York Times has said of A Ghost in the Throat: "[It is] a powerful, bewitching blend of memoir and literary investigation...Ní Ghríofa is deeply attuned to the gaps, silences and mysteries in women's lives, and the book reveals, perhaps above all else, how we absorb what we love - a child, a lover, a poem - and how it changes us from the inside out."

Documentary
The 2022 documentary Aisling Trí Néallaibh: Clouded Reveries (directed by Ciara NicChormaic) is an intimate exploration of Ní Ghríofa’s world and creative process, captured through intimate performances of her own work and in-depth interviews.

References

External links 
 In conversation with Doireann Ní Ghríofa by The Poetry Extension
 An interview with Doireann Ní Ghríofa by Tolka Journal
 Doireann Ní Ghríofa, 'In Albumen, In Pixels, In Bricks' by Dr Adam Hanna of The School of English, UCC
 On ghosts, obliteration, distance, and writing the self, in conversation with Megan Nolan 
 On rooftop-writing, wise advice, and translation as a drunken knife fight by The Arts Council of Ireland

Irish-language poets
Irish women poets
Living people
20th-century Irish people
21st-century Irish people
People from County Galway
People from County Clare
Year of birth missing (living people)
Alumni of University College Cork